Dioscorea is a genus of over 600 species of flowering plants in the family Dioscoreaceae, native throughout the tropical and warm temperate regions of the world. The vast majority of the species are tropical, with only a few species extending into temperate climates. It was named by the monk Charles Plumier after the ancient Greek physician and botanist Dioscorides.

Description 
Wild Yam (Dioscorea) is a vine that is invasive, deciduous, and herbaceous. This species is native to Asia, though, in the U.S., it is commonly found in Florida. Wild yams are an important crop, as they have been used to prevent menstrual cramps, stomach cramps, and general pain for centuries. During the 1950s scientists found that the roots of wild yams contained diosgenin which is a plant-based estrogen; diosgenin is hypothesized to aid in chemical defense against herbivores. This was used to create the first birth control pills during the 60s. In addition, some Dioscorea species are rich in nutrients and antioxidants. This is beneficial in rural areas where the plant is native because it enriches the diets of individuals who live in the area. These plants grow best near canopy gaps in woodlands and rainforests. Dioscorea uses vining behavior which is useful in tropical habitats because Dioscorea grow under canopies and need to latch onto different surfaces in order to grow upwards and acquire resources.

Cultivation and uses 
Several species, known as yams, are important agricultural crops in tropical regions, grown for their large tubers. Many of these are toxic when fresh, but can be detoxified and eaten, and are particularly important in parts of Africa, Asia, and Oceania.

One class of toxins found in many species is steroidal saponins, which can be converted through a series of chemical reactions into steroid hormones for use in medicine and as contraceptives.

The 1889 book "The Useful Native Plants of Australia" records that Dioscorea hastifolia is "One of the hardiest of the yams. The tubers are largely consumed by the local aborigines for food. (Mueller)."

Mechanism 
Although the mechanism of Dioscorea vine behavior is unknown, it is likely that Dioscorea acts similarly to vines in terms of growth and movement behavior. Vines have a touch-sensitive component that allows them to locate and latch onto a supporting base. They use nearby plants, rocks, trees, and structures for physical support. Their touch receptors allow them to reach out and sense objects. Vines seek out these surfaces by sending out shoots to assess the area. This behavior is dependent on the species, but these shoots typically move in a clockwise or counterclockwise direction, induced by circadian rhythms (Digital time-lapse video). When the vine makes contact with an object, the tendril shoot will coil around the object; this is a reaction called thigmotropism.  This tendril can control the amount of tension and squeeze the object to stay attached to it and prevent falling. Leaf growth is typically postponed until the relative stem has secured support. When leaf growth is delayed, shoot growth is hastened. Some vines produce an adhesive on their stems that contain calcium to better latch onto structures. A gradient is produced and the calcium exits cells to spread over stems. Furthermore, Dioscorea is a twiner, this means that the plant undergoes circumnutation which is a helical movement that allows stems to wrap around objects. In order for this mechanism to take place, endodermal cells, plasmodesmata, the plasma membrane, epidermal cells, calcium, potassium, chloride, and proton pumps are required. The SCR gene is also crucial for twining to occur. To better understand the physiology of Dioscorea further research must be conducted as much has still not been discovered.

Experiment 
In 2009, an experiment was conducted to address the mechanism of force generation in the twining plant, Dioscorea bulbifera. To do this, the authors used a mechanical pole that measured the squeezing force of the twining vine. Plants were grown in a greenhouse setting, and once the shoots of the plants started "circumnutating," a pole was introduced to allow for twining around the object. Authors found that the amount of force being applied to the pole when the vine is twining is due to the stretching of the stipule. The forces of the bending and twisting motion of D. bulbifera did not generate a measurable force.  In addition, this experiment indicates that stipules are not the only driving force for tension in vines and that they contribute to increased squeezing force later in development.

Overall, Dioscorea has a vining mechanism that allows it to obtain nutrients while living under a canopy; it has evolved to do this by seeking out surfaces to climb and latch onto. Vines, like Dioscorea, have touch-sensitive components that allow them to specialize in this behavior.

Cuisine 

The Alangan Tribe of Mangyan in the Island of Mindoro in the Philippines, locally known as Karot/Nami; Uses this type of tuber as an alternative of rice. Mangyan people typically soak it for 3 days, wash it in the running streams, dried for 2 days, and soak for 2 hours before cooking like a typical rice.

Accepted species (613), subspecies, and varieties 

The genus includes the following species and subspecies:

A
 Dioscorea abysmophila Maguire & Steyerm.
 Dioscorea abyssinica Hochst. ex Kunth
 Dioscorea acanthogene Rusby
 Dioscorea acerifolia Phil.
 Dioscorea acuminata Baker
 Dioscorea adenantha Uline
 Dioscorea aesculifolia R.Knuth
 Dioscorea aguilarii Standl. & Steyerm.
 Dioscorea alata L.
 Dioscorea alatipes Burkill & H.Perrier
 Dioscorea althaeoides R.Knuth
 Dioscorea altissima Lam.
 Dioscorea amaranthoides C.Presl
 Dioscorea amazonum Mart. ex Griseb.
 Dioscorea amazonum var. klugii (R.Knuth) Ayala
 Dioscorea amoena R.Knuth
 Dioscorea analalavensis Jum. & H.Perrier
 Dioscorea ancachsensis R.Knuth
 Dioscorea andina Phil.
 Dioscorea andromedusae O.Téllez
 Dioscorea angustifolia Rusby
 Dioscorea anomala Griseb.
 Dioscorea antaly Jum. & H.Perrier
 Dioscorea antucoana Uline ex R.Knuth
 Dioscorea arachidna Prain & Burkill
 Dioscorea araucana Phil.
 Dioscorea arcuatinervis Hochr.
 Dioscorea argyrogyna Uline ex R.Knuth
 Dioscorea arifolia C.Presl
 Dioscorea aristolochiifolia Poepp.
 Dioscorea arnensis R. Knuth
 Dioscorea asclepiadea Prain & Burkill
 Dioscorea aspera Humb. & Bonpl. ex Willd.
 Dioscorea aspersa Prain & Burkill
 Dioscorea asperula Pedralli
 Dioscorea asteriscus Burkill
 Dioscorea atrescens R.Knuth
 Dioscorea auriculata Poepp.

B
 Dioscorea bahiensis R.Knuth
 Dioscorea bako Wilkin
 Dioscorea balcanica Košanin
 Dioscorea bancana Prain & Burkill
 Dioscorea banzhuana S.J.Pei & C.T.Ting
 Dioscorea bartlettii C.V.Morton
 Dioscorea basiclavicaulis Rizzini & A.Mattos
 Dioscorea baya De Wild.
 Dioscorea beecheyi R.Knuth
 Dioscorea belophylla (Prain) Voigt ex Haines
 Dioscorea bemandry Jum. & H.Perrier
 Dioscorea bemarivensis Jum. & H.Perrier
 Dioscorea benthamii Prain & Burkill
 Dioscorea berenicea McVaugh
 Dioscorea bermejensis R.Knuth
 Dioscorea bernoulliana Prain & Burkill
 Dioscorea besseriana Kunth
 Dioscorea beyrichii R.Knuth
 Dioscorea bicolor Prain & Burkill
 Dioscorea biformifolia S.J.Pei & C.T.Ting
 Dioscorea biloba (Phil.) Caddick & Wilkin
 Dioscorea biplicata R.Knuth
 Dioscorea birmanica Prain & Burkill
 Dioscorea birschelii Harms ex R.Knuth
 Dioscorea blumei Prain & Burkill
 Dioscorea bolivarensis Steyerm.
 Dioscorea bonii Prain & Burkill
 Dioscorea bosseri Haigh & Wilkin
 Dioscorea brachybotrya Poepp.
 Dioscorea brachystachya Phil.
 Dioscorea bradei R.Knuth
 Dioscorea brandisii Prain & Burkill
 Dioscorea brevipetiolata Prain & Burkill
 Dioscorea bridgesii Griseb. ex Kunth
 Dioscorea brownii Schinz
 Dioscorea bryoniifolia Poepp.
 Dioscorea buchananii Benth.
 Dioscorea buckleyana Wilkin
 Dioscorea bulbifera L.
 Dioscorea bulbotricha Hand.-Mazz.
 Dioscorea burchellii Baker
 Dioscorea burkilliana J.Miège

C
 Dioscorea cachipuertensis Ayala
 Dioscorea calcicola Prain & Burkill
 Dioscorea caldasensis R.Knuth
 Dioscorea calderillensis R.Knuth
 Dioscorea callacatensis R.Knuth
 Dioscorea cambodiana Prain & Burkill
 Dioscorea campanulata Uline ex R.Knuth
 Dioscorea campestris Griseb.
 Dioscorea campos-portoi R.Knuth
 Dioscorea carionis Prain & Burkill
 Dioscorea carpomaculata O.Téllez & B.G.Schub.
 Dioscorea carpomaculata var. cinerea (Uline ex R.Knuth) O.Téllez & B.G.Schub. 	
 Dioscorea castilloniana Hauman
 Dioscorea catharinensis R.Knuth
 Dioscorea caucasica Lipsky
 Dioscorea cavenensis Lam.
 Dioscorea cayennensis Lam.
 Dioscorea cayennensis subsp. rotundata (Poir.) J.Miège; syn.: D. rotundata Poir.
 Dioscorea ceratandra Uline ex R.Knuth
 Dioscorea chacoensis R.Knuth
 Dioscorea chagllaensis R.Knuth
 Dioscorea chancayensis R.Knuth
 Dioscorea chaponensis R.Knuth
 Dioscorea chiapasensis Matuda
 Dioscorea chimborazensis R.Knuth
 Dioscorea chingii Prain & Burkill
 Dioscorea choriandra Uline ex R.Knuth
 Dioscorea chouardii Gaussen
 Dioscorea cienegensis R.Knuth
 Dioscorea cinnamomifolia Hook.
 Dioscorea cirrhosa  Lour.
 Dioscorea cissophylla Phil.
 Dioscorea claessensii De Wild.
 Dioscorea claussenii Uline ex R.Knuth
 Dioscorea claytonii Ayala
 Dioscorea cochleariapiculata De Wild.
 Dioscorea collettii Hook.f.
 Dioscorea collettii var. hypoglauca (Palib.) S.J.Pei & C.T.Ting
 Dioscorea communis (L.) Caddick & Wilkin
 Dioscorea commutata R.Knuth
 Dioscorea comorensis R.Knuth
 Dioscorea composita Hemsl.
 Dioscorea contracta R.Knuth
 Dioscorea convolvulacea Cham. & Schltdl.
 Dioscorea convolvulacea subsp. grandifolia (Schltdl.) Uline ex R.Knuth
 Dioscorea conzattii R.Knuth
 Dioscorea cordifolia Laness.
 Dioscorea coreana (Prain & Burkill) R.Knuth
 Dioscorea coriacea Humb. & Bonpl. ex Willd.
 Dioscorea coripatenis J.F.Macbr.
 Dioscorea coronata Hauman
 Dioscorea cotinifolia Kunth
 Dioscorea craibiana Prain & Burkill
 Dioscorea crateriflora R.Knuth
 Dioscorea crotalariifolia Uline
 Dioscorea cruzensis R.Knuth
 Dioscorea cubensis R.Knuth
 Dioscorea cumingii Prain & Burkill
 Dioscorea curitybensis R.Knuth
 Dioscorea cuspidata Humb. & Bonpl. ex Willd.
 Dioscorea cuyabensis R.Knuth
 Dioscorea cyanisticta J.D.Sm.
 Dioscorea cymosula Hemsl.
 Dioscorea cyphocarpa C.B.Rob. ex Knuth

D
 Dioscorea daunea Prain & Burkill
 Dioscorea davidsei O.Téllez
 Dioscorea de-mourae Uline ex R.Knuth
 Dioscorea debilis Uline ex R.Knuth
 Dioscorea decaryana H.Perrier
 Dioscorea decipiens Hook.f.
 Dioscorea decorticans C.Presl
 Dioscorea deflexa Griseb.
 Dioscorea delavayi Franch.
 Dioscorea delicata R.Knuth
 Dioscorea deltoidea Wall. ex Griseb.
 Dioscorea dendrotricha Uline
 Dioscorea densiflora Hemsl.
 Dioscorea depauperata Prain & Burkill
 Dioscorea diamantinensis R.Knuth
 Dioscorea dicranandra Donn.Sm.
 Dioscorea dielsii R.Knuth
 Dioscorea dissimulans Prain & Burkill
 Dioscorea divaricata Blanco
 Dioscorea diversifolia Griseb.
 Dioscorea dodecaneura Vell.
 Dioscorea dregeana (Kunth) T.Durand & Schinz
 Dioscorea duchassaingii R.Knuth
 Dioscorea dugesii C.B.Rob.
 Dioscorea dumetorum (Kunth) Pax
 Dioscorea dumetosa Uline ex R.Knuth

E
 Dioscorea ekmanii R.Knuth
 Dioscorea elegans Ridl. ex Prain & Burkill
 Dioscorea elephantipes (L'Hér.) Engl.
 Dioscorea entomophila Hauman
 Dioscorea epistephioides Taub.
 Dioscorea escuintlensis Matuda
 Dioscorea esculenta (Lour.) Burkill
 Dioscorea esquirolii Prain & Burkill
 Dioscorea exalata C.T.Ting & M.C.Chang

F
 Dioscorea fandra H.Perrier
 Dioscorea fasciculocongesta (Sosa & B.G.Schub.) O.Téllez
 Dioscorea fastigiata Gay
 Dioscorea fendleri R.Knuth
 Dioscorea ferreyrae Ayala
 Dioscorea filiformis Blume
 Dioscorea flabellifolia Prain & Burkill
 Dioscorea flaccida R.Knuth
 Dioscorea floribunda M.Martens & Galeotti
 Dioscorea floridana Bartlett
 Dioscorea fodinarum Kunth
 Dioscorea fordii Prain & Burkill
 Dioscorea formosana R.Knuth
 Dioscorea fractiflexa R.Knuth
 Dioscorea fuliginosa R.Knuth
 Dioscorea furcata Griseb.
 Dioscorea futschauensis Uline ex R.Knuth

G
 Dioscorea galeottiana Kunth
 Dioscorea galiiflora R.Knuth
 Dioscorea gallegosi Matuda
 Dioscorea garrettii Prain & Burkill
 Dioscorea gaumeri R.Knuth
 Dioscorea gentryi O.Téllez
 Dioscorea gillettii Milne-Redh.
 Dioscorea glabra Roxb.
 Dioscorea glandulosa (Griseb.) Klotzsch ex Kunth
 Dioscorea glandulosa var. calcensis (R.Knuth) Ayala
 Dioscorea glomerulata Hauman
 Dioscorea gomez-pompae O.Téllez
 Dioscorea gracilicaulis R.Knuth
 Dioscorea gracilipes Prain & Burkill
 Dioscorea gracilis Hook. ex Poepp.
 Dioscorea gracillima Miq.
 Dioscorea grandiflora Mart. ex Griseb.
 Dioscorea grandis R.Knuth
 Dioscorea grata Prain & Burkill
 Dioscorea gribinguiensis Baudon
 Dioscorea grisebachii Kunth
 Dioscorea guerrerensis R.Knuth
 Dioscorea guianensis R.Knuth

H
 Dioscorea haenkeana C.Presl
 Dioscorea hamiltonii Hook.f.
 Dioscorea hassleriana Chodat
 Dioscorea hastata Mill.
 Dioscorea hastatissima Rusby
 Dioscorea hastifolia Nees
 Dioscorea hastiformis R.Knuth
 Dioscorea haumanii Xifreda
 Dioscorea havilandii Prain & Burkill
 Dioscorea hebridensis R.Knuth
 Dioscorea hemicrypta Burkill
 Dioscorea hemsleyi Prain & Burkill
 Dioscorea heptaneura Vell.
 Dioscorea herbert-smithii Rusby
 Dioscorea herzogii R.Knuth
 Dioscorea heteropoda Baker
 Dioscorea hexagona Baker
 Dioscorea hieronymi Uline ex R.Knuth
 Dioscorea hintonii R.Knuth
 Dioscorea hirtiflora Benth.
 Dioscorea hirtiflora subsp. orientalis Milne-Redh.
 Dioscorea hispida Dennst.
 Dioscorea holmioidea Maury
 Dioscorea hombuka H.Perrier
 Dioscorea hondurensis R.Knuth
 Dioscorea howardiana O.Téllez, B.G.Schub. & Geeta
 Dioscorea humifusa Poepp.
 Dioscorea humilis Bertero ex Colla
 Dioscorea humilis subsp. polyanthes (F.Phil.) Viruel, Segarra & Villar
 Dioscorea hunzikeri Xifreda

I
 Dioscorea igualamontana Matuda
 Dioscorea incayensis R.Knuth
 Dioscorea inopinata Prain & Burkill
 Dioscorea insignis C.V.Morton & B.G.Schub.
 Dioscorea intermedia Thwaites
 Dioscorea ionophylla Uline ex R.Knuth
 Dioscorea iquitosensis R.Knuth
 Dioscorea irupanensis R.Knuth
 Dioscorea itapirensis R.Knuth
 Dioscorea itatiensis R.Knuth

J
 Dioscorea jaliscana S.Watson
 Dioscorea jamesonii R.Knuth
 Dioscorea japonica Thunb. - Shan yao in Chinese
 Dioscorea javariensis Ayala
 Dioscorea juxtlahuacensis (O.Téllez & Dávila) Caddick & Wilkin

K
 Dioscorea kalkapershadii Prain & Burkill
 Dioscorea kamoonensis Kunth
 Dioscorea keduensis Burkill ex Backer
 Dioscorea kerrii Prain & Burkill
 Dioscorea killipii R.Knuth
 Dioscorea kimiae Wilkin
 Dioscorea kingii R.Knuth
 Dioscorea kituiensis Wilkin & Muasya
 Dioscorea kjellbergii R.Knuth
 Dioscorea knuthiana De Wild.
 Dioscorea koepperi Standl.
 Dioscorea koyamae Jayas.
 Dioscorea kratica Prain & Burkill
 Dioscorea kunthiana Uline
 Dioscorea kuntzei Uline ex Kuntze

L
 Dioscorea lacerdaei Griseb.
 Dioscorea laevis Uline
 Dioscorea lamprocaula Prain & Burkill
 Dioscorea lanata Bail
 Dioscorea larecajensis Uline ex R.Knuth
 Dioscorea laurifolia Wall. ex Hook.f.
 Dioscorea lawrancei R.Knuth
 Dioscorea laxiflora Mart. ex Griseb.
 Dioscorea lehmannii Uline
 Dioscorea lepcharum Prain & Burkill
 Dioscorea lepida C.V.Morton
 Dioscorea leptobotrys Uline ex R.Knuth
 Dioscorea liebmannii Uline
 Dioscorea lijiangensis C.L.Long & H.Li
 Dioscorea linearicordata Prain & Burkill
 Dioscorea lisae Dorr & Stergios
 Dioscorea listeri Prain & Burkill
 Dioscorea litoralis Phil.
 Dioscorea loefgrenii R.Knuth
 Dioscorea loheri Prain & Burkill
 Dioscorea longicuspis R.Knuth
 Dioscorea longipes Phil.
 Dioscorea longirhiza Caddick & Wilkin
 Dioscorea longituba Uline
 Dioscorea lundii Uline ex R.Knuth
 Dioscorea luzonensis Schauer

M
 Dioscorea macbrideana R.Knuth
 Dioscorea maciba Jum. & H.Perrier
 Dioscorea macrantha Uline ex R.Knuth
 Dioscorea macrothyrsa Uline
 Dioscorea macvaughii B.G.Schub.
 Dioscorea madecassa H.Perrier
 Dioscorea madiunensis Prain & Burkill
 Dioscorea maianthemoides Uline ex R.Knuth
 Dioscorea mamillata Jum. & H.Perrier
 Dioscorea mandonii Rusby
 Dioscorea mangenotiana J.Miège
 Dioscorea mantigueirensis R.Knuth
 Dioscorea margarethia G.M.Barroso, E.F.Guim. & Sucre
 Dioscorea marginata Griseb.
 Dioscorea martensis R.Knuth
 Dioscorea martiana Griseb.
 Dioscorea martini Prain & Burkill
 Dioscorea matagalpensis Uline
 Dioscorea matudae O.Téllez & B.G.Schub.
 Dioscorea mayottensis Wilkin
 Dioscorea megacarpa Gleason
 Dioscorea megalantha Griseb.
 Dioscorea melanophyma Prain & Burkill
 Dioscorea melastomatifolia Uline ex Prain
 Dioscorea membranacea Pierre ex Prain & Burkill
 Dioscorea menglaensis H.Li
 Dioscorea meridensis Kunth
 Dioscorea merrillii Prain & Burkill
 Dioscorea mesoamericana O.Téllez & Mart.-Rodr.
 Dioscorea mexicana Scheidw.
 Dioscorea microbotrya Griseb.
 Dioscorea microcephala Uline
 Dioscorea microura R.Knuth
 Dioscorea mindanaensis R.Knuth
 Dioscorea minima C.B.Rob. & Seaton
 Dioscorea minutiflora Engl.
 Dioscorea mitis C.V.Morton
 Dioscorea mitoensis R.Knuth
 Dioscorea modesta Phil.
 Dioscorea mollis Kunth
 Dioscorea monadelpha (Kunth) Griseb.
 Dioscorea × monandra Hauman
 Dioscorea morelosana (Uline) Matuda
 Dioscorea moritziana (Kunth) R.Knuth
 Dioscorea mosqueirensis R.Knuth
 Dioscorea moultonii Prain & Burkill
 Dioscorea moyobambensis R.Knuth
 Dioscorea mucronata Uline ex R.Knuth
 Dioscorea multiflora Mart. ex Griseb.
 Dioscorea multiloba Kunth
 Dioscorea multinervis Benth.
 Dioscorea mundii Baker

N
 Dioscorea nako H.Perrier
 Dioscorea namorokensis Wilkin
 Dioscorea nana Poepp.
 Dioscorea nanlaensis H.Li
 Dioscorea natalensis R.Knuth
 Dioscorea natalia Hammel
 Dioscorea neblinensis Maguire & Steyerm.
 Dioscorea nelsonii Uline ex R.Knuth
 Dioscorea nematodes Uline ex R.Knuth
 Dioscorea nervata R.Knuth
 Dioscorea nervosa Phil.
 Dioscorea nicolasensis R.Knuth
 Dioscorea nieuwenhuisii Prain & Burkill
 Dioscorea nipensis R.A.Howard
 Dioscorea nipponica Makino
 Dioscorea nitens Prain & Burkill
 Dioscorea nuda R.Knuth
 Dioscorea nummularia Lam.
 Dioscorea nutans R.Knuth

O
 Dioscorea oaxacensis Uline
 Dioscorea obcuneata Hook.f.
 Dioscorea oblonga Gleason
 Dioscorea oblongifolia Rusby
 Dioscorea obtusifolia Hook. & Arn.
 Dioscorea olfersiana Klotzsch ex Griseb.
 Dioscorea oligophylla Phil.
 Dioscorea omiltemensis O.Téllez
 Dioscorea opaca R.Knuth
 Dioscorea oppositiflora Griseb.
 Dioscorea oppositifolia  L. - Shan yao in Chinese
 Dioscorea orangeana  Wilkin
 Dioscorea orbiculata Hook.f.
 Dioscorea orbiculata var. tenuifolia (Ridl.) Thapyai
 Dioscorea oreodoxa B.G.Schub.
 Dioscorea organensis R.Knuth
 Dioscorea orientalis (J.Thiébaut) Caddick & Wilkin
 Dioscorea orizabensis Uline
 Dioscorea orthogoneura Uline ex Hochr.
 Dioscorea oryzetorum Prain & Burkill
 Dioscorea ovalifolia R.Knuth
 Dioscorea ovata Vell.
 Dioscorea ovinala Baker

P
 Dioscorea palawana Prain & Burkill
 Dioscorea paleata Burkill
 Dioscorea pallens Schltdl.
 Dioscorea pallidinervia R.Knuth
 Dioscorea palmeri R.Knuth
 Dioscorea panamensis R.Knuth
 Dioscorea panthaica Prain & Burkill
 Dioscorea pantojensis R.Knuth
 Dioscorea paradoxa Prain & Burkill
 Dioscorea pavonii Uline ex R.Knuth
 Dioscorea pedicellata Phil.
 Dioscorea pencana Phil.
 Dioscorea pendula Poepp. ex Kunth
 Dioscorea pentaphylla L.
 Dioscorea peperoides Prain & Burkill
 Dioscorea perdicum Taub.
 Dioscorea perenensis R.Knuth
 Dioscorea perpilosa H.Perrier
 Dioscorea petelotii Prain & Burkill
 Dioscorea philippiana Uline ex R.Knuth
 Dioscorea piauhyensis R.Knuth
 Dioscorea pierrei Prain & Burkill
 Dioscorea pilcomayensis Hauman
 Dioscorea pilgeriana R.Knuth
 Dioscorea pilosiuscula Bertero ex Spreng.
 Dioscorea pinedensis R.Knuth
 Dioscorea piperifolia Humb. & Bonpl. ex Willd.
 Dioscorea piscatorum Prain & Burkill
 Dioscorea pittieri R.Knuth
 Dioscorea planistipulosa Uline ex R.Knuth
 Dioscorea plantaginifolia R.Knuth
 Dioscorea platycarpa Prain & Burkill
 Dioscorea platycolpota Uline ex B.L.Rob.
 Dioscorea plumifera C.B.Rob.
 Dioscorea pohlii Griseb.
 Dioscorea pohlii var. luschnathiana (Kunth) Uline ex R.Knuth
 Dioscorea poilanei Prain & Burkill
 Dioscorea polyclados Hook.f.
 Dioscorea polygonoides Humb. & Bonpl. ex Willd.
 Dioscorea polystachya Turcz. (also: Dioscorea batatas Decne)
 Dioscorea pomeroonensis R.Knuth
 Dioscorea potarensis R.Knuth
 Dioscorea praehensilis Benth.
 Dioscorea prainiana R.Knuth
 Dioscorea prazeri Prain & Burkill
 Dioscorea preslii Steud.
 Dioscorea preussii Pax
 Dioscorea preussii subsp. hylophila (Harms) Wilkin
 Dioscorea pringlei C.B.Rob.
 Dioscorea proteiformis H.Perrier
 Dioscorea psammophila R.Knuth
 Dioscorea pseudomacrocapsa G.M.Barroso, E.F.Guim. & Sucre
 Dioscorea pseudorajanioides R.Knuth
 Dioscorea pseudotomentosa Prain & Burkill
 Dioscorea pteropoda Boivin ex H.Perrier
 Dioscorea pubera Blume
 Dioscorea pubescens Poir.
 Dioscorea pumicicola Uline
 Dioscorea pumilio Griseb.
 Dioscorea puncticulata R.Knuth
 Dioscorea purdiei R.Knuth
 Dioscorea putisensis R.Knuth
 Dioscorea putumayensis R.Knuth
 Dioscorea pynaertii De Wild.
 Dioscorea pyrenaica Bubani & Bordère ex Gren.
 Dioscorea pyrifolia Kunth

Q
 Dioscorea quartiniana A.Rich.
 Dioscorea quaternata J.F. Gmel.
 Dioscorea quinquelobata Thunb.
 Dioscorea quispicanchensis R.Knuth

R
 Dioscorea racemosa (Klotzsch) Uline
 Dioscorea regnellii Uline ex R.Knuth
 Dioscorea remota C.V.Morton
 Dioscorea remotiflora Kunth
 Dioscorea reticulata Gay
 Dioscorea retusa Mast.
 Dioscorea reversiflora Uline
 Dioscorea ridleyi Prain & Burkill
 Dioscorea riedelii R.Knuth
 Dioscorea rigida R.Knuth
 Dioscorea rimbachii R.Knuth
 Dioscorea rockii Prain & Burkill
 Dioscorea rosei R.Knuth
 Dioscorea rumicoides Griseb.
 Dioscorea rupicola Kunth
 Dioscorea rusbyi Uline

S
 Dioscorea sabarensis R.Knuth
 Dioscorea sagittata Poir.
 Dioscorea sagittifolia Pax
 Dioscorea sagittifolia var. lecardii (De Wild.) Nkounkou
 Dioscorea salicifolia Blume
 Dioscorea salvadorensis Standl.
 Dioscorea sambiranensis R.Knuth
 Dioscorea sanchez-colini Matuda
 Dioscorea sandiensis R.Knuth
 Dioscorea sandwithii B.G.Schub.
 Dioscorea sanpaulensis R.Knuth
 Dioscorea sansibarensis Pax
 Dioscorea santanderensis R.Knuth
 Dioscorea santosensis R.Knuth
 Dioscorea sarasinii Uline ex R.Knuth
 Dioscorea saxatilis Poepp.
 Dioscorea scabra Humb. & Bonpl. ex Willd.
 Dioscorea schimperiana Hochst. ex Kunth
 Dioscorea schubertiae Ayala
 Dioscorea schunkei Ayala & T.Clayton
 Dioscorea schwackei Uline ex R.Knuth
 Dioscorea scortechinii Prain & Burkill
 Dioscorea secunda R.Knuth
 Dioscorea sellowiana Uline ex R.Knuth
 Dioscorea semperflorens Uline
 Dioscorea septemloba Thunb.
 Dioscorea septemnervis Vell.
 Dioscorea sericea R.Knuth
 Dioscorea seriflora Jum. & H.Perrier
 Dioscorea serpenticola Hoque & P.K.Mukh.
 Dioscorea sessiliflora McVaugh
 Dioscorea sexrimata Burkill
 Dioscorea simulans Prain & Burkill
 Dioscorea sincorensis R.Knuth
 Dioscorea sinoparviflora C.T.Ting, M.G.Gilbert & Turland
 Dioscorea sinuata Vell.
 Dioscorea sitamiana Prain & Burkill
 Dioscorea skottsbergii R.Knuth
 Dioscorea smilacifolia De Wild. & T.Durand
 Dioscorea sonlaensis R.Knuth
 Dioscorea sororopana Steyerm.
 Dioscorea soso Jum. & H.Perrier
 Dioscorea soso var. trichopoda (Jum. & H.Perrier) Burkill & H.Perrier
 Dioscorea spectabilis R.Knuth
 Dioscorea spicata Roth
 Dioscorea spiculiflora Hemsl.
 Dioscorea spiculoides Matuda
 Dioscorea spongiosa J.Q.Xi, M.Mizuno & W.L.Zhao
 Dioscorea sprucei Uline ex R.Knuth
 Dioscorea standleyi C.V.Morton
 Dioscorea stegelmanniana R.Knuth
 Dioscorea stellaris R.Knuth
 Dioscorea stemonoides Prain & Burkill
 Dioscorea stenocolpus Phil.
 Dioscorea stenomeriflora Prain & Burkill
 Dioscorea stenopetala Hauman
 Dioscorea stenophylla Uline
 Dioscorea sterilis O.Weber & Wilkin
 Dioscorea stipulosa Uline ex R.Knuth
 Dioscorea subcalva Prain & Burkill
 Dioscorea subhastata Vell.
 Dioscorea sublignosa R.Knuth
 Dioscorea submigra R.Knuth
 Dioscorea subtomentosa Miranda
 Dioscorea sumatrana Prain & Burkill
 Dioscorea sumiderensis B.G.Schub. & O.Téllez
 Dioscorea suratensis R.Knuth
 Dioscorea sylvatica Eckl.
 Dioscorea synandra Uline
 Dioscorea syringifolia (Kunth) Kunth & R.H.Schomb. ex R.Knuth

T
 Dioscorea tabatae Hatus. ex Yamashita & M.N.Tamura
 Dioscorea tacanensis Lundell
 Dioscorea tamarisciflora Prain & Burkill
 Dioscorea tamoidea Griseb.
 Dioscorea tamshiyacuensis Ayala
 Dioscorea tancitarensis Matuda
 Dioscorea tarijensis R.Knuth
 Dioscorea tarmensis R.Knuth
 Dioscorea tauriglossum R.Knuth
 Dioscorea tayacajensis R.Knuth
 Dioscorea temascaltepecensis R.Knuth
 Dioscorea tenebrosa C.V.Morton
 Dioscorea tenella Phil.
 Dioscorea tentaculigera Prain & Burkill
 Dioscorea tenuipes Franch. & Sav.
 Dioscorea tenuiphyllum R.Knuth
 Dioscorea tenuis R.Knuth
 Dioscorea tequendamensis R.Knuth
 Dioscorea ternata Griseb.
 Dioscorea therezopolensis Uline ex R.Knuth
 Dioscorea togoensis R.Knuth
 Dioscorea tokoro Makino ex Miyabe
 Dioscorea toldosensis R.Knuth
 Dioscorea tomentosa J.Koenig ex Spreng.
 Dioscorea torticaulis R.Knuth
 Dioscorea trachyandra Griseb.
 Dioscorea trachycarpa Kunth
 Dioscorea traillii R.Knuth
 Dioscorea transversa R.Br.
 Dioscorea triandria Sessé & Moc.
 Dioscorea trichantha Baker
 Dioscorea trichanthera Gleason
 Dioscorea trifida L.f.
 Dioscorea trifoliata Kunth
 Dioscorea trifurcata Hauman
 Dioscorea trilinguis Griseb.
 Dioscorea trimenii Prain & Burkill
 Dioscorea trinervia Roxb. ex Prain & Burkill
 Dioscorea trisecta Griseb.
 Dioscorea trollii R.Knuth
 Dioscorea truncata Miq.
 Dioscorea tsaratananensis H.Perrier
 Dioscorea tubiperianthia Matuda
 Dioscorea tubuliflora Uline ex R.Knuth 
 Dioscorea tubulosa Griseb.

U
 Dioscorea uliginosa Phil.
 Dioscorea ulinei Greenm. ex R.Knuth
 Dioscorea undatiloba Baker
 Dioscorea urceolata Uline
 Dioscorea urophylla Hemsl.
 Dioscorea uruapanensis Matuda

V
 Dioscorea valdiviensis R.Knuth
 Dioscorea vanvuurenii Prain & Burkill
 Dioscorea variifolia Bertero
 Dioscorea velutipes Prain & Burkill
 Dioscorea vexans Prain & Burkill
 Dioscorea vilis Kunth
 Dioscorea villosa L.
 Dioscorea volckmannii Phil.

W
 Dioscorea wallichii Hook.f.
 Dioscorea warburgiana Uline ex Prain & Burkill
 Dioscorea warmingii R.Knuth
 Dioscorea wattii Prain & Burkill
 Dioscorea weberbaueri R.Knuth
 Dioscorea widgrenii R.Knuth
 Dioscorea wightii Hook.f.
 Dioscorea wittiana R.Knuth
 Dioscorea wrightii Uline ex R.Knuth

X
 Dioscorea xizangensis C.T.Ting

Y
 Dioscorea yunnanensis Prain & Burkill

Z
 Dioscorea zingiberensis C.H.Wright

The closely related genus Tamus is included in Dioscorea by some sources, but is maintained as distinct by others. For Dioscorea communis (L.) Caddick & Wilkin, see Tamus communis.

See also 
 Yams
 Mexican barbasco trade

References

Bibliography 

 Flora Europaea: Dioscorea
 Flora of Pakistan: Dioscorea
 Schols, P. 2004. Contributions to the palynology and phylogeny of Dioscorea (Dioscoreaceae). PhD thesis KU Leuven.

 
Dioscoreales genera
Tubers
Dioecious plants